Sophia is the first EP namesake of the Brazilian pop singer-songwriter Sophia. Was launched in July 2014 with four tracks. Despite the artist having done contract with Sony, the work was released independently. The EP is the genre Pop.

Track list
No Final (Sophia, Rique Azevedo, Samille Joker) – 3:28
Deixa Eu Gostar de Você (Lucas Silveira, Karen Jonz) – 3:54
Tudo Que Eu Sempre Quis (Sophia, Rique Azevedo) – 2:37
Deixa Estar (Sophia, Gustavo Pagan, Rique Azevedo, João Milliet) – 2:38

Release history

References

2014 debut EPs
Sophia Abrahão albums